Arotrophora khatana is a species of moth of the family Tortricidae. It is found in Thailand.

The wingspan is about 13 mm for males and 19 mm for females. The ground colour of forewings is yellow brown, but more brown along the costa and more grey in the dorsal half of the terminal area and at the tornus. The hindwings are brownish grey.
Manish Khatana Gurjar

References

Moths described in 2009
Arotrophora
Moths of Asia